Alexandar Bonchev (Bulgarian: Александър Бончев; born 30 November 1965 in Bulgaria) is a Bulgarian retired footballer.

References

Bulgarian footballers
Living people
1965 births
Association football wingers
Association football forwards
SV Darmstadt 98 players
MSV Duisburg players
PFC Levski Sofia players
FC Carl Zeiss Jena players